is a former Japanese football player.

Playing career
Sasaki was born in Tokyo on September 25, 1974. After graduating from Waseda University, he joined J1 League club Cerezo Osaka in 1997. On March 8, he debuted against Kashima Antlers in J.League Cup. On April 12, he debuted against Nagoya Grampus Eight in J1 League He played as left side back in 1997. However he could hardly play in the match in 1998 and retired end of 1998 season.

Club statistics

References

External links

1974 births
Living people
Waseda University alumni
Association football people from Tokyo
Japanese footballers
J1 League players
Cerezo Osaka players
Association football defenders